Steven A. Rosenberg (born 2 August 1940) is an American cancer researcher and surgeon, chief of Surgery at the National Cancer Institute in Bethesda, Maryland and a Professor of Surgery at the Uniformed Services University of Health Sciences and the George Washington University School of Medicine and Health Sciences. He pioneered the development of immunotherapy that has resulted in the first effective immunotherapies and the development of gene therapy. He is the first researcher to successfully insert foreign genes into humans.

Early life
Rosenberg was born in 1940, in the Bronx, the youngest of three children of Jewish immigrants from Poland, who owned a luncheonette. He met his wife to be, Alice O’Connell during his residency at Boston’s Peter Bent Brigham Hospital, who was the chief nurse at the time. They got married in 1968 and have three daughters.

Methodology
He is accredited with developing the use of IL-2 and immune cells for the treatment of patients with melanoma in a procedure termed adoptive cell transfer.   He has shown that expanding immune cells (known as tumor infiltrating lymphocytes) in the lab can be  used to treat patients with melanoma and has published two important studies describing their use. The first in 2002, demonstrated that some patients with advanced melanoma can be treated to complete remission with a combination of chemotherapy, immune cells and high doses of IL-2. The second, in 2006, demonstrated that the receptor of T cells can be transferred to immune cells and in combination with chemotherapy and high doses of IL-2 can be used to treat patients with melanoma. Although, this was the first time that the T cell receptor was used for gene therapy, it was not the first time that gene therapy was used in cancer.  Tumor cells modified with a gene for immune growth factors such as GM-CSF, had been used many years previously and continue to be used, although the efficacy of GM-CSF modified tumor lines as a cancer vaccine remain extremely modest, at best. There has been some debate as to the role of the T cells in treating the cancer in these studies as high-dose IL-2 and chemotherapy have also been shown to have anti-cancer properties. Nevertheless, the combination of chemotherapy, T cells and high-dose IL-2 was shown to be effective even in patients who had previously failed high-dose IL-2 treatment.

Rosenberg has pioneered the use of adoptive immunotherapy.

Education 
Rosenberg graduated from the Bronx High School of Science.  He received his B.A. (biology, 1961) and M.D. (1964) degrees from Johns Hopkins University. He served a surgical internship and residency at the Peter Bent Brigham Hospital, completing it in 1974.  During his residency he also earned a Ph.D. in biophysics from Harvard University with thesis titled The proteins of human erythrocyte membranes (in 1968/1969). Following the completion of his surgical residency, he became the Chief of Surgery at the National Cancer Institute, a position he continues to hold. His research has focused on the immunotherapy of cancer.

Awards and honors 
 1992 Golden Plate Award of the American Academy of Achievement
 2011 William B. Coley Award for Distinguished Research in Tumor Immunology of the Cancer Research Institute
 2013 Keio Medical Science Prize
 2015 Medal of Honor of the American Cancer Society
 2018 Albany Medical Center Prize in Medicine and Biomedical Research 
 2019 Edogawa NICHE Prize
 2019 Szent-Györgyi Prize for Progress in Cancer Research
 2021 Dan David Prize
 2022 Pezcoller Foundation-AACR International Award for Extraordinary Achievements in Cancer Research

See also 
 Cell therapy
 Chimeric antigen receptor
 Immunotherapy
 Iovance Biotherapeutics

References

External links
 Gene therapy rids men of cancer, BBC News (2006 coverage of cancer breakthrough discovered by his team)
 "Cancer Miracles", Robert Langreth, Forbes, 2009

1940 births
American medical researchers
American oncologists
Cancer researchers
Fellows of the AACR Academy
Harvard University alumni
Jewish physicians
Johns Hopkins University alumni
Living people
Massry Prize recipients
Members of the National Academy of Medicine